Aglaonema modestum, called Chinese evergreen, green-for-ten-thousand-years, and lily of China, is a species of flowering plant in the genus Aglaonema, native to Bangladesh, Thailand, Laos, Vietnam, and southeast and south-central China. In these areas, it is found in tropical swamps and rainforests.

Cultivation 
It has gained the Royal Horticultural Society's Award of Garden Merit.

Its lance-shaped leaves measure , and are borne on  stalks that arise from a central growing point.

A. modestum requires a shaded location, and should not be exposed to temperatures below , which can damage the foliage. It cannot endure direct sunlight and is a good choice for dimly lit rooms. It requires ample moisture except for a very short winter rest period, in which watering can be somewhat reduced. Young plants should be repotted every spring, while mature specimens need be repotted only every two to three years.

Toxicity 
This plant contains calcium oxalate crystals which are poisonous to humans, dogs, cats, and horses. If ingested, it may cause severe burning and swelling in the mouth and tongue. Contact with the sap may also cause skin irritation.

References

modestum
House plants
Plants described in 1879